West Coast blues is a type of blues music influenced by jazz and jump blues, with strong piano-dominated sounds and jazzy guitar solos, which originated from Texas blues players who relocated to California in the 1940s.  West Coast blues also features smooth, honey-toned vocals, frequently crossing into rhythm and blues territory.

Texas and the West Coast

The towering figure of West Coast blues may be the guitarist T-Bone Walker, famous for the song "Call It Stormy Monday (But Tuesday Is Just as Bad)", a relocated Texan, who made his first recordings in the late 1920s. In the early 1940s, Walker moved to Los Angeles, where he recorded many enduring sides for Capitol, Black & White, and Imperial. Walker was a crucial figure in the electrification and urbanization of the blues, probably doing more to popularize the electric guitar in the form than anyone else. Much of his material had a distinct jazzy jump blues feel, an influence that would characterize much of the most influential blues to emerge from California in the 1940s and 1950s.

Other Texas bluesmen followed: the pianist and songwriter Amos Milburn, the singer Percy Mayfield (who would later become famous for the song "Hit the Road Jack"), and Charles Brown moved to Los Angeles. The guitarist Pee Wee Crayton divided his time between Los Angeles and San Francisco. Lowell Fulson, from Texas by way of Oklahoma, moved to Oakland.

Little Willie Littlefield was a R&B and boogie-woogie pianist and singer whose early recordings helped forge a vital link between boogie-woogie and rock and roll.

See also
List of West Coast blues musicians

References

External links
Bay Area Blues Society

Music of Texas
Blues music genres